Arnold Charles Kettle (17 March 1916 – 24 December 1986) was a British Marxist literary critic, most noted for his authorship of the two-volume work An Introduction to the English Novel (1951). Kettle was born in Ealing, London, and was educated at Merchant Taylors' School, Northwood and Pembroke College, Cambridge. Influenced by F. R. Leavis in his academic writings, he was a man of the left politically and joined the Communist Party of Great Britain in 1936, remaining a member for the rest of his life. He was the Open University’s first professor of literature and worked there until his retirement in 1981.

Selected publications
 Kettle, A. (1951). An Introduction to the English Novel, Volume I (to George Eliot) and (1953) An Introduction to the English Novel, Volume II (Henry James to the present day), Hutchinson University Library.
 Kettle, A., Kott, J., & Taborski, B. (1965). Shakespeare in a changing world.
 Kettle, A. (Ed.) (1972). The nineteenth-century novel: critical essays and documents. Heinemann Educational Publishers.
 Kettle, A. (1991). Literature and Liberation: Selected Essays. Manchester University Press.

References 

1916 births
1986 deaths
Alumni of Pembroke College, Cambridge
British literary critics
Communist Party of Great Britain members
Literary theorists